Maimouna Diarra (born 30 January 1991) is a Senegalese basketball player for Club Deportivo Promete of La Liga Feminina. She represented Senegal in the basketball competition at the 2016 Summer Olympics.

References

External links
WNBA Profile

Senegalese women's basketball players
Basketball players at the 2016 Summer Olympics
Olympic basketball players of Senegal
1991 births
Living people
Senegalese expatriate basketball people in Angola
Senegalese expatriate basketball people in Bulgaria
Senegalese expatriate basketball people in France
Senegalese expatriate basketball people in Spain
Senegalese expatriate basketball people in the United States
Sportspeople from Saint-Louis, Senegal
Centers (basketball)
African Games bronze medalists for Senegal
African Games medalists in basketball
Competitors at the 2015 African Games